Neliswa Peggy Nkonyeni (born 8 September 1961) is a South African politician and educator. A member of the African National Congress, she has been the Member of the Executive Council (MEC) for Finance in KwaZulu-Natal since 2022.

In November 2004, she was appointed as the MEC for Health. Nkonyeni was elected as the speaker of the legislature after the 2009 general election. In 2013, Nkonyeni was made MEC for Education, a position she held until she was demoted from the executive council in 2016. She was sworn in as a member of the National Assembly of South Africa, the lower house of parliament, in February 2018. Following the 2019 general election, Nkonyeni returned to the KwaZulu-Natal legislature and was appointed MEC for Human Settlements and Public Works. In March 2021, she was appointed MEC for  Transport, Community Safety and Liaison.

Early life and career
Nkonyeni was born on 8 September 1961 in Oshabeni outside Port Shepstone in the Natal Province. She trained to be a secondary school teacher and taught from 1989 to 1999.

Political career
A member of the African National Congress (ANC) and the South African Communist Party, Nkonyeni was elected to the KwaZulu-Natal Legislature in the 1999 general election as an ANC representative. From 1999 to 2004, she served as an ANC whip and chairperson of the Parliamentary Women's Caucus. Before her appointment to the Executive Council, she was chairperson of committees in the legislature.

In November 2004, premier S'bu Ndebele reshuffled his Executive Council and appointed Nkonyeni as the MEC responsible for the provincial Department of Health. Her tenure as Health MEC was controversial. Nkonyeni was seen as a HIV/AIDS denialist. She denounced the World Health Organization (WHO) for not providing "a clear message on the role of nutrition in delaying the progression of HIV to AIDS" in 2005. Nkonyeni also claimed that zidovudine (AZT), a medication for preventing and treating HIV/AIDS, was "toxic" and that antiretroviral medication had severe side effects. She promoted Ubhejane, an untested, expensive traditional herbal medicine used by many to treat HIV/AIDS.  In December 2008,  Nkonyeni and five others were arrested by the Scorpions and charged with corruption, fraud and racketeering involving the unneeded purchase of equipment at inflated prices. The charges against her were later dropped.

After the 2009 general election, Nkonyeni was elected as the speaker of the provincial legislature. She held this position until October 2013, when she was made the MEC for Education. She took over from Senzo Mchunu, who was elected premier. After the 2014 general election, Nkonyeni remained in her position as MEC for Education. In 2016, Willies Mchunu took over as premier and Nkonyeni was recalled as an MEC. Mthandeni Dlungwane replaced her as Education MEC.

On 27 February 2018, she was sworn in as a Member of the National Assembly of South Africa for the ANC, replacing the late Beatrice Ngcobo. She returned to the provincial legislature after the 2019 general election and was appointed MEC for Human Settlements and Public Works by the newly elected premier, Sihle Zikalala.

On 9 March 2021, Nkonyeni was appointed MEC for Transport, Community Safety and Liaison, replacing the late Bheki Ntuli, as part of a mini reshuffle done by Zikalala.

On 11 August 2022, Nkonyeni was named MEC for Finance by the newly elected premier Nomusa Dube-Ncube.

References

External links

Living people
1961 births
People from Port Shepstone
Zulu people
African National Congress politicians
South African Communist Party politicians
Members of the National Assembly of South Africa
Members of the KwaZulu-Natal Legislature